Abu Janlu (also Romanized as Abū Jānlū; also known as Ābājānlū, Abidzhanglu, Abijanglu, Āb-i-Jānlu, and Ābūchānlū) is a village in Ijrud-e Pain Rural District, Halab District, Ijrud County, Zanjan Province, Iran. At the 2006 census, its population was 60, in 17 families.

References 

Populated places in Ijrud County